Anza is a census-designated place located in southern Riverside County, California, in the Anza Valley, a semi-arid region at a mean elevation of  above sea level. Anza is on the Pacific Crest Trail. The population was 3,075 at the 2020 census.

Locally, Anza and several other mountain communities (including Garner Valley, Idyllwild, Pinyon Pines and Aguanga) are collectively referred to as "the Hill."

The ZIP code is 92539, and the community is inside area code 951.

History 

It is estimated that the Cahuilla aboriginal tribes inhabited an area including what is today the Anza Valley more than two thousand years ago and encountered Europeans only as late as 1774, when a Spanish expedition in search of an overland route from Sonora to Alta California made its way from Tubac, Sonora through the valley to Monterey, Alta California. Explorer Juan Bautista de Anza first passed through the valley on March 16, 1774, and again on December 27, 1775. De Anza originally named the valley "San Carlos"; it was renamed in his honor from Cahuilla Valley to Anza Valley on September 16, 1926.

Up until about 1580 the area was in the proximity of a larger body of inland water known as Lake Cahuilla, but that inland lake larger than the current Salton Sea, which occupies a portion of its former location, evaporated, thus increasing the desert character of the Anza Valley. These climatic and cultural factors can be seen as having exercised a unique influence on the early European settlers of the Anza Valley. During the 19th century, settlement included ranchers, a limited number of miners, and honey producers. The mid-to-late 19th century witnessed moderate population and above average economic prosperity for this isolated community.

From the late 1860s on, Anza was largely settled by families seeking to build ranches under the Homestead Act. Of the homesteads in the area, one, the Cary Ranch on Cary Road (south of Anza, east of the Tripp Flats Ranger Station) still exists and is still owned and occupied by family members of the original settlers. The ranch is now occupied by the Hopkins family. The Hopkins are direct descendants of the Cary family. Although the Cary Ranch used to encompass hundreds of acres of land, most has been sold off, and only a  parcel and several original buildings exist.

The post office opened in 1926.

Already in the 1970s sales of property parcels and lots in Anza were promoted with particular emphasis on the proximity of the unspoiled countryside to larger coastal cities of southern California. Though perceived by outsiders as friendly and open to newcomers, Anza has been determined to avoid the social and environmental problems of over-urbanization, and since the 1980s the community has sought to preserve its unique artistic and creative culture by closely scrutinizing any development plans that could give rise to dysfunctions experienced in other regions of the state.

Anza has sought incorporation as a town, or to develop a community council. If it incorporates, it would be the smallest municipality in Riverside County. Meanwhile, Cabazon, California has also sought incorporation, and they would be similarly small like Anza, if this occurs. There are over 3,000 permanent residents in Anza, as well as a seasonal summer population to double the community to near 6,000.

Geography 

According to the United States Census Bureau, the CDP covers an area of 27.7 square miles (71.7 km), 99.7% of it land and 0.3% of it water.

Regional geographic subdivisions of the unincorporated town include Anza Valley and Cave Rocks (Central); Tripp Flats, Chandler Heights and Cahuilla (West) as well as Oak Spring, Burnt Spring and Heller Spring (East). The Anza Valley in which the unincorporated town is nestled is bordered by three significant mountains: Cahuilla Mountain to the west, Thomas Mountain to the northeast and Beauty Mountain to the southwest.

The area is characterized as high desert, experiencing somewhat stronger temperature variations than those of the coastal cities, including sudden dips of temperature even on summer evenings, due to the high elevation. The Anza Trail—originally travelled on horseback by Juan Bautista de Anza in 1774 through what was then referred to as the Cahuilla Valley—traverses the community from southeast to northwest.

Climate 
According to the Köppen Climate Classification system, Anza has a warm-summer Mediterranean climate. Anza weather can range from warm to hot with common afternoon thunderstorms during summer, to chilly with occasional rain and snow during fall and winter. Its higher 4000 ft elevation at the edge of the mountains  makes the weather much cooler and far more variable than the lower surrounding cities with often drastic day-to-day changes.

During the summer months, highs range from the lower 80s to mid 90s with low temperatures in the 50s and 60s. Monsoon thunderstorms are common in the afternoon between July and September when typically 3–6" of rain falls. October high temperatures are in the 60s and 70s with night lows in the 40s and 50s with under .25" of rain. Between November and early December, high temperatures are typically in the lower 50s and 60s with lows in the upper 20s and 30s. Rain doesn't fall often and is usually light, occasionally turning to snow with light dustings. Total rainfall is typically 1" or less.

During winter, typical highs are in the 40s and 50s with overnight lows in the lower 20s and 30s. Precipitation is a varied with rain and snowfall occurring 1–2 days a week. An entire winter typically sees  5–10" of rain and 8–16" of snow with a couple snowfalls of several inches to 1 ft common over  the higher east side of town. Snowfall melts quickly in the much warmer daytime temperatures with little tree coverage, although deeper more regular snowpack can found over the upper reaches of town near the treeline at 5000 ft at the border of the San Bernardino National Forest. Spring is brief with any snowfall ending by early April and rain becoming a rarity by May and June with 1–2" of rain falling mostly in March and April.

Demographics 

The 2010 United States Census reported that Anza had a population of 3,014. The racial makeup of Anza was 2,411 (80.0%) White (67.5% Non-Hispanic White), 34 (1.1%) African American, 57 (1.9%) Native American, 36 (1.2%) Asian, 3 (0.1%) Pacific Islander, 347 (11.5%) from other races, and 126 (4.2%) from two or more races. Hispanic or Latino of any race were 791 persons (26.2%).

The Census reported that 3,014 people (100% of the population) lived in households, 0 (0%) lived in non-institutionalized group quarters, and 0 (0%) were institutionalized.

There were 1,160 households, out of which 331 (28.5%) had children under the age of 18 living in them, 592 (51.0%) were opposite-sex married couples living together, 115 (9.9%) had a female householder with no husband present, 67 (5.8%) had a male householder with no wife present.  There were 84 (7.2%) unmarried opposite-sex partnerships, and 14 (1.2%) same-sex married couples or partnerships. 294 households (25.3%) were made up of individuals, and 106 (9.1%) had someone living alone who was 65 years of age or older. The average household size was 2.60.  There were 774 families (66.7% of all households); the average family size was 3.10.

The population was spread out, with 679 people (22.5%) under the age of 18, 215 people (7.1%) aged 18 to 24, 620 people (20.6%) aged 25 to 44, 1,003 people (33.3%) aged 45 to 64, and 497 people (16.5%) who were 65 years of age or older.  The median age was 44.8 years. For every 100 females, there were 102.8 males.  For every 100 females age 18 and over, there were 100.9 males.

The homeowner vacancy rate was 3.7%; the rental vacancy rate was 8.8%.  2,103 people (69.8% of the population) lived in owner-occupied housing units and 911 people (30.2%) lived in rental housing units.

According to the 2010 United States Census, Anza had a median household income of $39,637, with 11.5% of the population living below the federal poverty line.

Culture 
Due to its history and relative isolation for hundreds of years, Anza is dissimilar to many areas in California settled during the same period. The cultural identity of many long-time Anzanites exhibits the marked influence of Cahuillan aboriginal culture on the White population, expressed in terms of art and folklore.

During the 1990s, the community enjoyed an increasingly widespread reputation as a growing artists colony featuring newcomers from as far away as Europe. Common free-time activities include trail wandering, local historical activities and festivals as well as motorbiking, rockhounding and horseback riding along the Anza Trail. The Mountain Cahuilla operate a casino from their reservation on the southwestern edge of the community.

Every summer, Anza has a parade to celebrate the Fourth of July. This festival is called Anza Days and is celebrated by the whole town, and people travel miles each year to see it.

Anza also has a local gymkhana horseshowing circuit put on by the Lions Club six months out of the year. This is also a popular event the public enjoys.

Education 
 Hamilton High School, Hemet Unified School District.
 Olivet University, a private Christian university, is located in Anza.

Notable people 
 Red Skelton lived here until his death. He owned a  horse ranch in the Anza Valley.

References

Further reading

 Frederick, B. Legends and History of the San Jacinto Mountains.
 Holmes, S. History of Riverside County, California

External links 
 On-Line Community Website for the City of Anza
 A Historical Site Dedicated to the People and History of Anza, California

Census-designated places in Riverside County, California
Populated places in the Colorado Desert
Census-designated places in California